The 1978 Berlin Open, also known as the International Championships of Berlin, was a men's tennis tournament staged in Berlin, West Germany that was part of the Grand Prix circuit. The tournament was played on outdoor clay courts and was held from 19 June until 25 June 1978. It was the fourth edition of the tournament and fifth-seeded Vladimír Zedník won the singles title.

Finals

Singles
 Vladimír Zedník defeated  Harald Elschenbroich 6–4, 7–5, 6–2
 It was Zedník's only singles title of his career.

Doubles
 Jürgen Fassbender /  Colin Dowdeswell defeated  Željko Franulović /  Hans Gildemeister 6–3, 6–4

References

External links
 ITF tournament edition details

Berlin Open
Berlin Open
Berlin Open, 1978
Berlin Open